David Ó Floinn, Irish Dominican, died 17 August 1770.

Ó Floinn was a descendant of the Ó Floinn of Síol Maelruain, a territory located on the border of County Roscommon and County Galway.
Bishop O'Brien stated of his family that:

The O'Flynns' present chief is Edmond O'Flinn of Ballinlough. The Right Hon. Lady Ellen O'Flinn, Countess de la Hues of Lahnes Castle in Normandy, is of the same direct branch of the O'Flinns, her ladyship being a daughter of Timothy O'Flinn of Clydagh in Co. Roscommon.

Ó Floinn was born in County Galway and educated in Paris, graduating from the Sorbonne. In time, he was appointed to James Francis Edward Stuart at Saint-Germain-en-Laye. He died there, and was buried in the crypt of the parish church, in 1770. He was attended at his funeral by two nephews, Dr. Charles Ó Floinn and Father Jean Evrines. Father Evrines, rector of the town's general hospital, presented to it in 1778 a sum of money to maintain two orphans from the age of five to twenty.

References

 Facolóir gaodhilge-sax-bhéarla, or, An Irish-English dictionary, Bishop John O'Brien of Cloyne, Paris, 1768
 Biographical Dictionary of Irishmen in France, Richard Hayes, Dublin, 1949

18th-century Irish people
People from County Galway
1770 deaths